The 'Duke of York Group may refer to:

 Atafu, Tokelau was named Duke of York Group under British colonization.
 Duke of York Archipelago, Canada
 Duke of York Islands, New Guinea